Thomas Mahon may refer to:

Thomas Mahon (Irish MP) (1701–1782), MP for County Roscommon
Thomas Mahon, 2nd Baron Hartland (1766–1835), MP for County Roscommon, grandson of the above
Thomas Mahon (tailor), English tailor and weblogger
Thomas J. Mahon, American politician and jurist